Jean-Pierre Vallat (10 August 1951 – 22 June 2021) was a French historian and archeologist.

Biography
He then studied at the French School of Rome from 1978 to 1981. In 1982, he became a researcher at the French National Centre for Scientific Research, a position he held until 1988.

In 1997, he supported a habilitation titled Histoire économique et sociale de la Campanie à l’époque romaine. He also served on the Federation of General Unions of National Education.

From 2000 to 2004, Vallat directed the school of human sciences at Paris Diderot University. In 2012, he became a professor emeritus of the university.

Jean-Pierre Vallat died on 22 June 2021 at the age of 69.

Publications
La cité des Ségusiaves à l'époque romaine (Ier siècle av. J. C. au IVe ap. J. C.) (1981)
Statut juridique et statut réel des terres en Campanie du Nord (III-I av. J. C.) (1981)
Structures agraires en Italie centro-méridionale : cadastres et paysages ruraux (1987)
Campagnes de la Méditerranée romaine : Occident (1993)
L'Italie et Rome : 218-31 av. J.-C. (1995)
Le bail romain dans l'historiographie de la Méditerranée occidentale (1997)
La banlieue nord de Paris : gestion, sauvegarde et conservation du patrimoine (1997)
Mémoires de patrimoines (2009)
Le Togo : lieux de mémoire et sites de conscience (2013)
Figuig, une oasis au cœur des cultures (2014)
La géoarchéologie française au xxie siècle, French geoarcheology in the 21st century (2019)
Les mondes romains : questions d'archéologie et d'histoire (2020)

References

1951 births
2021 deaths
20th-century French historians
21st-century French archaeologists
French National Centre for Scientific Research scientists
École Normale Supérieure alumni
Academic staff of Sorbonne Paris North University
Academic staff of Paris Diderot University
People from Loire (department)
21st-century French historians
20th-century French archaeologists